The Glen Melville Dam is a dam supplied by the Orange-Fish River Tunnel, near Grahamstown, Eastern Cape, South Africa. It was established in 1992 and its main purpose is for domestic and industrial use.

The construction of the dam was motivated by the lack of access to sufficient water in Grahamstown.

See also 

 Department of Water Affairs (South Africa)
 List of dams in South Africa
 List of rivers in South Africa

References 

Dams in South Africa
Buildings and structures in Makhanda, Eastern Cape